Klondyke is an unincorporated community in Irondale Township, Crow Wing County, Minnesota, United States. The community lies just south of County Route 12 and on the north shore of Lookout Lake. It lies approximately three miles south of Crosby and Ironton.

A post office called Klondike was in operation from 1897 until 1907. The name is an allusion to the Klondike Gold Rush, as Crow Wing County is also a mining region.

References

Unincorporated communities in Crow Wing County, Minnesota
Unincorporated communities in Minnesota